Kattathadka is a small town in Puthige Grama Panchayat in Kasaragod district, Kerala, India. It is located in Perla-Kumbla road near to Seethangoli, Kasaragod.

References

Suburbs of Kasaragod